The European Journal of Cardio-Thoracic Surgery, abbreviated Eur J Cardiothorac Surg, is an academic journal, principally covering topics pertaining to cardiac surgery and thoracic surgery.

Editorial board
The journal has an editorial board of 28, with 13 associate editors, 8 assistant editors, a managing editor, an editorial manager, and an editor-in-chief.

Access
Articles in the journal become open access one year after publication. The journal is abstracted and indexed by:
Current Contents (Clinical Medicine)
EMBASE
Medline
Scopus
Iberoamericana de Información Científica] (SIIC) Data Bases (in Spanish and Portuguese)

References

Surgery journals
Cardiology journals
Monthly journals
Publications established in 1987
Academic journals associated with international learned and professional societies of Europe
Oxford University Press academic journals